Bertalan is a Hungarian masculine given name, a cognate of Bartholomew. Individuals bearing the name Bertalan include:

Bertalan Andrásfalvy (born 1931), Hungarian ethnographer and politician
Bertalan Árkay (1901–1971), Hungarian modernist designer and architect
Bertalan Bicskei (1944–2011), Hungarian footballer and manager
Bartolomeu Dragfi (Bertalan Drágffy; fl. 15th-century), Hungarian nobleman
Bertalan Dunay (1877–1961), Hungarian fencer
Bertalan Farkas (born 1949), Hungarian cosmonaut and Esperantist
Bertalan Hajtós (born 1965), Hungarian judoka 
Bertalan Karlovszky (1858–1938), Hungarian painter
Bertalan Kun (born 1999), Hungarian footballer 
Bertalan Lányi (1851–1921), Hungarian politician and jurist
Bertalan de Némethy (1911–2002), Hungarian cavalry officer and show jumping coach 
Bertalan Papp (1913–1992), Hungarian fencer
Bertalan Pintér (born 1973), Hungarian bobsledder
Bertalan Pór (1880–1964), Hungarian painter
Bertalan Rubinstein (also known as Bert Ruby; 1910–1967), Hungarian-American wrestler, trainer, and promoter
Bertalan Széchényi (1866–1943), Hungarian politician
Bertalan Székely (1835–1910), Hungarian painter
Bertalan Szemere (1812–1869), Hungarian poet, nationalist, and Prime Minister of Hungary
Bertalan Zakany (born 1984), Hungarian figure skater
Bertalan Zsótér (1906–1980), Hungarian sports shooter

References

Masculine given names
Hungarian masculine given names